Mason Shane Kinsey (born August 29, 1998) is an American football wide receiver for the Tennessee Titans of the National Football League (NFL). He played college football at Berry College.

College career
Kinsey attended Division III Berry College. In four seasons, he had 203 receptions for 3,343 yards and 50 touchdowns. Kinsey helped the Vikings win four consecutive Southern Athletic Association (SAA) championships and earn three straight bids to the NCAA Division III playoffs. He was a three-time All-SAA first-team honoree and was a third-team D3football.com All-American as a senior.

Professional career

Tennessee Titans
Kinsey signed with the Tennessee Titans as an undrafted free agent on April 25, 2020, shortly after the conclusion of the 2020 NFL Draft. He was waived on September 5, 2020, during final roster cuts.

New England Patriots
Kinsey was signed by the New England Patriots to their practice squad on September 8, 2020. He was released on October 1, 2020, but was resigned on October 19. Kinsey was released a second time on November 18.

Tennessee Titans (second stint)
Kinsey was signed to a reserve/futures contract with the Titans on January 21, 2021. He was cut at the end of the preseason again on August 31, 2021, but was resigned to the team's practice squad the following day. Kinsey was elevated to the Titans' active roster on October 24, 2021. After the Titans were eliminated in the Divisional Round of the 2021 playoffs, he signed a reserve/future contract on January 24, 2022.

On August 30, 2022, Kinsey was waived by the Titans and signed to the practice squad the next day. Kinsey was elevated to the active roster on October 21,2022.  He signed a reserve/future contract on January 10, 2023.

References

External links
Tennessee Titans bio
Berry Vikings bio

1998 births
Living people
Players of American football from Georgia (U.S. state)
American football wide receivers
Berry College alumni
Tennessee Titans players